Holliston Church is a United Methodist church in Pasadena, California, United States. It primarily serves the Korean community in the greater Pasadena area.  The building was moved stone by stone in 1923 from its original location at the corner of Lake Ave. and Colorado Blvd. in Pasadena to its current location, 1305 East Colorado Boulevard.

References 

Churches in Pasadena, California
Churches completed in 1923
1923 establishments in California
Korean-American culture in California